Harold William Lane (born 1945) is a former Canadian provincial politician. He was a Progressive Conservative member of the Legislative Assembly of Saskatchewan, representing the electoral district of Saskatoon Sutherland from 1977 until 1978.

He was first elected in a by-election following the death of Evelyn Edwards, but was defeated by Peter Prebble of the New Democrats in the 1978 election.

References

1945 births
Progressive Conservative Party of Saskatchewan MLAs
Politicians from Saskatoon
Living people